Cult is an American mystery psychological thriller television series created by Rockne S. O'Bannon that ran on The CW from February 19 to July 12, 2013. The series centers on a journalist blogger and a production assistant, who investigate a series of mysterious disappearances that are linked to a popular television series named Cult.

On February 27, 2013, The CW announced that starting March 8 Cult would air on Fridays at 9:00 pm Eastern/8:00 pm Central. On April 10, 2013, Cult was canceled and removed from the schedule. The CW began airing the six remaining episodes on June 28, 2013.

Plot 
The series follows Jeff (Matthew Davis), a journalist blogger, and Skye (Jessica Lucas), a production researcher on a popular television crime series called Cult, as they investigate the fans of the series, who could be re-creating the crimes committed on the series.

Cast and characters

Main 
 Matthew Davis as Jeffrey Dean "Jeff" Sefton, a journalist blogger.
 Jessica Lucas as Skye Yarrow, a production assistant.
 Alona Tal as Marti Gerritsen, an actress playing Kelly Collins on a show called Cult.
 Robert Knepper as Roger Reeves, an actor playing Billy Grimm on a show called Cult.

Recurring 
 Marie Avgeropoulos as Kirstie
 Christian Cooper as Andy
 Aisha Hinds as Det. Roslyn Sakelik
 Stacey Farber as E.J.
 Ben Hollingsworth as Peter Grey
 Jeffrey Pierce as Stuart Reynolds

Production 
Cult was originally supposed to air on the now defunct network, The WB. When The WB was replaced by The CW, the executives of The CW at that time dropped the show, which was supposed to star Matthew Bomer. In January 2012, a revised version of the series was revived on The CW with a pilot order. The series was created by Rockne S. O'Bannon, who also serves as executive producer alongside Josh Schwartz, Stephanie Savage, Len Goldstein and the production companies Warner Bros. Television and Fake Empire Productions.

Jessica Lucas was cast in the lead role of Skye Yarrow in February 2012, a young production assistant who teams with a journalist blogger to investigate the fans of a popular television series entitled Cult. Alona Tal was cast next as Marti Gerritsen, the actress playing the role of Kelly Collins in the fictional series Cult. Robert Knepper then followed in the role of Roger Reeves, the actor playing the role of Billy Grimm in the show-within-a-show. Matthew Davis was cast in the lead role of Jeff Sefton, the journalist blogger working with Skye and Andrew Leeds was cast in the recurring role of Kyle Segal, the executive working on the show-within-a-show. Ben Hollingsworth will also have a recurring role, as associate producer Peter Grey. Stacey Farber joined the series in a recurring role as E.J. a tech-savvy girl, who works with Jeff and helps him in the search for his sibling.

The pilot was officially picked up by The CW on May 11, 2012.

About the show's reception, Rockne S. O'Bannon said: "It was such an unusual piece of material, and for better or for worse, such a singular vision piece that the network and the studio were very respectful of what I wanted to do with it. I'm very proud of this show because, though it went nowhere very quickly, it was very well received."

Star Matt Davis blames  Cult being canceled on marketing and jokingly express his frustration over the announcement on Twitter:"Good news Cult fans! Cult has been renewed for the next ten season due to its brilliant marketing campaign! Good job everyone." and then added "It was a wonderful learning experience, and exciting misadventure."

About the show cancelation, Jessica Lucas said: "That show was never supposed to be just a thirteen-episode show. It opened up a ton of questions in the first season and you never get to find out what happened. But this is the nature of it and I don’t do things for results, I do things for experience. I really wanted to stay in that role and I really wanted to stay involved in that world and I can’t control whether people see it or how it went. I would have liked to do more of it – it just obviously didn’t turn out that way."

Episodes

References

External links 
 

2010s American drama television series
2010s American horror television series
2010s American mystery television series
2013 American television series debuts
2013 American television series endings
American thriller television series
Television series about cults
The CW original programming
English-language television shows
Fictional cults
Horror drama television series
Psychological thriller television series
Television series about actors
Television series about television
Television series by CBS Studios
Television series by Warner Bros. Television Studios
Television shows filmed in Vancouver
Television shows set in Los Angeles